St. Augustine High School is the oldest active public high school in the St. Johns County School District, located in unincorporated St. Johns County, Florida, with a St. Augustine postal address. It teaches students in grades 9 through 12. SAHS is home to an athletics department, performing arts department, visual arts department, Aerospace Academy, Teaching Assistant, and Army Junior Reserve Officers' Training Corps (JROTC), and Law and Homeland Security Academy.

In addition to St. Augustine, its attendance boundary includes: Vilano Beach, and the majority of St. Augustine Beach.

Academic programs

AICE Program 
The Advanced International Certificate of Education program, administered by Cambridge International Examinations, has been hosted at SAHS since 1998, and makes advanced college-level courses available to high school students. The program challenges students academically with an accelerated curriculum. The AICE program is a four-year set of courses. 9th and 10th-grade students will be introduced to the IGCSE program, then later move to the AICE courses.

The program offers a rigorous international pre-university curriculum and examination system which emphasizes the value of broad and balanced study for academically advanced students.  The AICE Diploma is a group certificate which requires students to draw from three curriculum areas.  The areas are mathematics and sciences, languages, and arts and humanities.  Students must pass a total of six exams with at least one in each of the three curriculum areas.

Students who earn an AICE diploma and have completed 100 hours of community service qualify for the 100% Bright Futures Scholarship, and the SAT/ACT requirement is waived.

Aerospace Academy 
Mission Statement:  To provide a supportive small learning community for students to explore careers in aerospace.  Student will develop skills that mold them into confident, college-prepared individuals.  The Aerospace Academy is affiliated with Embry Riddle University.

Army JROTC 
St. Augustine High School also has its own JROTC battalion. The Jacket Battalion has been an honor unit with distinction for the last five years, gone to state competition for the last five years (unarmed platoon drill), and is the leading battalion in North East Florida and the greater Jacksonville area.

Sports

Football 
The St. Augustine High School football program has competed in the FHSAA football state playoffs 25 times, making their first appearance in 1972 under coach Herman "Foots" Brumley.  Brumley's teams made six playoff appearances from 1972 to 1979, including five consecutive appearances from 1975 to 1979, winning the district championship in all five seasons.  The Yellow Jackets had a playoff record of 4–6 under Brumley before his retirement after the 1980 season.  The Yellow Jackets saw little success in the period from Brumley's retirement until the late 1990s, with head coach Charles Lopez leading the Yellow Jackets to a lone playoff game in the 1993 season.

In 1996, Joey Wiles was introduced as the new head football coach for St. Augustine.  Wiles would head the program for the next 20 seasons and would establish himself as one of the top five winningest coaches in the state.  In the 1999 season, the Yellow Jackets returned to the playoffs, marking the start of an 22-season playoff appearance streak which ended in 2021.  Two seasons later, only in Wiles's sixth season at the helm, St. Augustine made their first appearance in a state championship game, which they lost 6–38 to Rockledge High School.  The Yellow Jackets would finally break through in 2005, going 15–0 and defeating Booker High School 31–15 to claim their first state championship.  The Yellow Jackets would return to the championship game two seasons later, but lost to Naples 10–17.
Since Wiles took over the program in 1996 until his resignation after the 2015 season, the Yellow Jackets went 198–43, including 59–3 against St. Johns County schools, made 17 consecutive playoff appearances, won 14 district titles, – including 11 straight from 2004 to 2014 – achieved 7 undefeated regular seasons, won 50 consecutive district games from 2003 to 2015 – a streak which ranked fourth in state history at the time – and appeared in three state championship games, winning one of them.

Brian Braddock was hired following Wiles's departure after the 2015 season to take the job of Assistant Athletic Director at Flagler College.  In his first season leading the team, the Yellow Jackets reclaimed the district title and reached the region finals of the playoffs, St. Augustine's best playoff result since 2010.

The Yellow Jackets play at Joey Wiles–Walt Slater Field at H. L. "Foots" Brumley Stadium.

Performing and visual arts 
St. Augustine High School is also known as the Center of the Arts (also known as SJCCA, or St. Johns County Center of the Arts) high school for St. Johns county. It features Band, Chorus, Dance, Guitar, Theatre, Musical Theatre, Technical Production in Musical Theatre, Technical Production in Theatre, and Visual Arts.

Band 
The St. Augustine High School's top band, "The Jazz Ambassadors", was invited to perform at the Montreux Jazz Festival on two occasions (1996 and 1999) as well as the Umbria Jazz Festival and North Sea Jazz Festival(1999).

The marching band performs at the school's home football games; concert band is a concert ensemble setting.

Guitar 
The SAHS Guitar program consists of three levels of Guitar classes, Guitar One, Guitar Two and the Classical Guitar Ensemble. The Guitar Ensemble is a smaller group of students selected based on superior skill and talent. The Ensemble has performed at numerous public events including two trips to the growing Florida Guitar Association in Tampa, Fla.. In addition to this the Ensemble has played for world-famous classical guitarist Pepe Romero.

Notable alumni 

 Caleb Sturgis, former NFL kicker  
 Brandon James, Edmonton Eskimos football player
 Steven L. Sears, television writer/producer
 Scott Player, former NFL punter
 Ronald L. Bailey, Lieutenant General, United States Marine Corps
 Jeffrey Cernese, Child actor
 Anderson Davis, Former Salutatorian

References 

High schools in St. Johns County, Florida
Public high schools in Florida